Dorcadion megriense is a species of beetle in the family Cerambycidae. It was described by Lazarev in 2009. It is known from Armenia.

References

megriense
Beetles described in 2009